Claire Malis (February 17, 1943 – August 24, 2012) was an American actress. In later years she was often credited as Claire Malis Callaway.

Malis was perhaps best known as the second actress to play Dr. Dorian Lord on the ABC daytime soap opera One Life to Live from 1977 to 1979. She appeared in the 1980 television series From Here to Eternity as Dr. Anne Brewster. The 13-episode series continued the story of the 1979 miniseries of the same name. Malis went on to guest star on numerous drama and comedy TV series and multiple films. Between 1983 and 1988 Malis portrayed Rose Polniaczek, mother of series regular Jo, in six episodes of the NBC sitcom The Facts of Life.

Death
Malis suffered from non-Hodgkin lymphoma but recovered through a stem cell transplant administered at City of Hope Helford Clinical Research Hospital in Duarte, California in 2010. She died of congestive heart failure and pneumonia on August 24, 2012 at City of Hope. She was 69. She is survived by her husband, architectural and interior designer Thomas Callaway; their son Catlin; and her brother Lee.

References

External links

1943 births
2012 deaths
Actresses from Gary, Indiana
American film actresses
American soap opera actresses
American television actresses
Deaths from pneumonia in California
21st-century American women